Samuel Moore (February 8, 1774February 18, 1861) was a member of the U.S. House of Representatives from Pennsylvania.

Samuel Moore was born in Deerfield (now Deerfield Street) in the Province of New Jersey.  He graduated from the University of Pennsylvania at Philadelphia with an A.B. degree in 1792 then worked as an instructor at the university from 1792 to 1794.  He studied medicine and practised in Dublin, Pennsylvania, and later in Greenwich, New Jersey.  Moore spent several years in trading to the East Indies.  He returned to Bucks County, Pennsylvania, and in 1808 purchased and operated grist and oil mills at Bridge Point, Pennsylvania, (now Edison) near Doylestown.  He later erected and operated a sawmill and woollen factory.

Moore was elected as a Republican to the Fifteenth Congress to fill the vacancy caused by the resignation of Samuel D. Ingham.  He was reelected to the Sixteenth and Seventeenth Congresses, serving until his resignation on May 20, 1822.  He served as chairman of the United States House Committee on Indian Affairs during the Seventeenth Congress.  He was appointed by President James Monroe as Director of the United States Mint on July 15, 1824, holding this office until 1835.  Moore moved to Philadelphia, Pennsylvania, where he became interested in the mining and marketing of coal, serving as president of the Hazleton Coal Company until his death in Philadelphia in 1861.  Samuel Moore is interred in The Woodlands Cemetery.

In 1832 Moore's daughter, Elizabeth, married Clement Finley, who later became the 10th Surgeon General of the United States Army.

Sources

The Political Graveyard

External links

1774 births
1861 deaths
Politicians from Philadelphia
University of Pennsylvania alumni
Directors of the United States Mint
Democratic-Republican Party members of the United States House of Representatives from Pennsylvania
Burials at The Woodlands Cemetery
Monroe administration personnel
John Quincy Adams administration personnel
Jackson administration personnel